Palaquium walsurifolium is a tree in the family Sapotaceae. The specific epithet walsurifolium refers to similarity of the tree's leaves to those of the genus Walsura.

Description
The bark is rusty brown. Inflorescences bear up to five flowers.

Distribution and habitat
Palaquium walsurifolium is native to Sumatra, Peninsular Malaysia and Borneo. Its habitat is peat swamp, lowland mixed dipterocarp and alluvial forests.

References

walsurifolium
Trees of Sumatra
Trees of Peninsular Malaysia
Trees of Borneo
Plants described in 1909